Johan van Zyl Steyn, Baron Steyn, PC (15 August 1932 – 28 November 2017) was a South African-British judge, until September 2005 a Law Lord. He sat in the House of Lords as a crossbencher.

Early life and education

Steyn was born in Stellenbosch in the Union of South Africa, the son of Janet Lacey Blignaut and Izak van Zyl Steyn, a professor of law at the University of Stellenbosch. His father died before he turned three years old and he subsequently were sent to live with his paternal grandparents. He received his schooling at the Hoërskool Jan van Riebeeck in Cape Town where he matriculated in 1950. He studied law at the University of Stellenbosch before reading Law as a Rhodes Scholar at University College, Oxford.

Career 
He was called to the Bar in South Africa in 1958 and appointed a Senior Counsel of the Supreme Court of South Africa in 1970.
 
As a result of his opposition to apartheid in his native South Africa, he settled in the UK in 1973, joining the English Bar and building a distinguished international commercial law practice. He married Susan Heard (née Lewis) in 1977, having two sons and two daughters from a previous marriage to Jean Pollard. He had eight grandchildren (from his first marriage) and three stepgrandchildren (from his second marriage). His daughter Dame Karen Steyn was appointed a High Court judge in 2019. 

He was appointed Queen's Counsel in 1979 and was appointed a High Court Judge in 1985, receiving the customary knighthood, a surprise appointment by the then Conservative Lord Chancellor Lord Hailsham. He served as presiding judge of the Northern Circuit from 1989 to 1991 and was appointed Lord Justice of Appeal in 1992.

On 11 January 1995 he was elevated to a Lord of Appeal in Ordinary and was created a life peer as Baron Steyn, of Swafield in the County of Norfolk. As a Law Lord he achieved prominence for his liberal views and espousal of human rights. He was a fierce critic of Augusto Pinochet's claim to stand immune from prosecution. His record of open criticism of Camp X-Ray at Guantanamo Bay led to pressure from the UK government that he make himself unavailable for the hearing on the indefinite detention of suspects under the Anti-terrorism, Crime and Security Act 2001 that began on 4 October 2004. The decision in the latter case caused the government to review its policy of indefinite detention of terror suspects and led to the equally controversial Terrorism Bill 2005. His judicial work in the House of Lords has been instrumental in weaving the Human Rights Act 1998 into the fabric of English law. He also drew upon his background as a commercial lawyer.

His Hart Lecture of May 2000 was influential in its criticism of Pepper (Inspector of Taxes) v Hart [1992] UKHL 3, a landmark decision of the House of Lords on the use of legislative history in statutory interpretation.

He was one of the few senior judges to support calls for modernisation of the English legal system and abolition of the role of Lord Chancellor. While a Lord of Appeal he refrained from speaking in the House, instead expressing his views on democracy and human rights through judgments and lectures.

He retired as a Lord of Appeal in Ordinary on 30 September 2005. Jonathan Mance was elevated from Lord Justice of Appeal on 1 October 2005 to replace him. Since his retirement he was for a period the chairman of the human rights organisation JUSTICE and was vocal in his criticism of Tony Blair's government and its approach to human rights. He had expressed grave misgivings over the proposed powers to allow detention without trial and about the use of existing anti-terror powers.

Death 
On 10th October 2021 as part of the traditional 'Wigs and Mitres Service' lecture at Lincoln's Inn Chapel his ashes were interred there.

Famous judgments

R v Bournewood Community and Mental Health NHS Trust Ex p. L [1999] 1 AC 458
R (Jackson) v Attorney General [2006] 1 AC 262 - controversial comments on parliamentary supremacy and its common law foundations (and the possibility for the courts to invalidate unconstitutional statutes)
MacLean v Arklow Investments Ltd [2000] 1 WLR 594 (Privy Council)
Barclays Bank plc v Quincecare Ltd [1992] 4 All ER 363

References

External links
 Profile in The Guardian

1932 births
2017 deaths
Afrikaner people
English King's Counsel
South African Rhodes Scholars
Law lords
Crossbench life peers
South African members of the Privy Council of the United Kingdom
Alumni of University College, Oxford
20th-century King's Counsel
Stellenbosch University alumni
South African members of the Judicial Committee of the Privy Council
South African Knights Bachelor
South African Senior Counsel
South African emigrants to the United Kingdom
White South African anti-apartheid activists
20th-century English lawyers
Alumni of Hoërskool Jan van Riebeeck